Joseph Yannick M'Boné (born 16 April 1993) is a Cameroonian professional footballer who plays as a defender for French  club Dunkerque.

Career
M'Boné made his professional debut on 31 August 2011 in a 3–2 Coupe de la Ligue victory over Brest. The following month, he made his league debut in a 1–0 defeat of Toulouse.

On 7 July 2022, M'Boné signed with Dunkerque.

Career statistics
.

References

External links
 
 

Living people
1993 births
Footballers from Yaoundé
Association football midfielders
Cameroonian footballers
Cameroonian expatriate footballers
Cameroonian expatriate sportspeople in France
Expatriate footballers in France
Stade Malherbe Caen players
ÉFC Fréjus Saint-Raphaël players
LB Châteauroux players
USL Dunkerque players
Ligue 1 players
Ligue 2 players
Championnat National players